Philip Bruce Embleton (20 December 1948 – 22 May 1974) was a British racewalker. He competed in the men's 20 kilometres walk at the 1972 Summer Olympics.

References

1948 births
1974 deaths
Athletes (track and field) at the 1972 Summer Olympics
British male racewalkers
Olympic athletes of Great Britain
Place of birth missing